Ryan Stevenson may refer to:

 Ryan Stevenson (cricketer) (born 1992), English cricketer
 Ryan Stevenson (drummer) (born 1987), Canadian drummer and singer
 Ryan Stevenson (footballer) (born 1984), Scottish footballer
 Ryan Stevenson (singer) (born 1979), American Christian musician, singer, guitarist

See also
 Ryan Stephenson (disambiguation)